In mathematics, Machin-like formulae are a popular technique for computing  (the ratio of the circumference to the diameter of a circle) to a large number of digits.  They are generalizations of John Machin's formula from 1706:

which he used to compute  to 100 decimal places.

Machin-like formulas have the form

These formulas are used in conjunction with Gregory's series, the Taylor series expansion for arctangent:

Derivation
The angle addition formula for arctangent asserts that

if

All of the Machin-like formulas can be derived by repeated application of equation .  As an example, we show the derivation of Machin's original formula one has:

and consequently

Therefore also

and so finally

An insightful way to visualize equation  is to picture what happens when two complex numbers are multiplied together:

The angle associated with a complex number  is given by:

Thus, in equation , the angle associated with the product is:

Note that this is the same expression as occurs in equation .  Thus equation  can be interpreted as saying that multiplying two complex numbers means adding their associated angles (see multiplication of complex numbers).

The expression:

is the angle associated with:

Equation  can be re-written as:

Here  is an arbitrary constant that accounts for the difference in magnitude between the vectors on the two sides of the equation.  The magnitudes can be ignored, only the angles are significant.

Using complex numbers
Other formulas may be generated using complex numbers. If  then  is 45 degrees or  radians. This means that if the real part and complex part are equal then the arctangent will equal . Since the arctangent of one has a very slow convergence rate if we find two complex numbers that when multiplied will result in the same real and imaginary part we will have a Machin-like formula. If we multiply these out we will get . Therefore, .

If you want to use complex numbers to show that  you first must know that when multiplying angles you put the complex number to the power of the number that you are multiplying by. So  and since the real part and imaginary part are equal then,

Lehmer's measure
One of the most important parameters that characterize computational efficiency of a Machin-like formula is the Lehmer's measure, defined as 
.
In order to obtain the Lehmer's measure as small as possible, it is necessary to decrease the ratio of positive integers  in the arctangent arguments and to minimize the number of the terms in the Machin-like formula. Nowadays at  the smallest known Lehmer's measure is  due to H. Chien-Lih (1997), whose Machin-like formula is shown below. It is very common in the Machin-like formulas when all numerators

Two-term formulas
In the special case where the numerator , there are exactly four solutions having only two terms. All four were found by John Machin in 1705–1706, but only one of them became widely known when it was published in William Jones's book Synopsis Palmariorum Matheseos, so the other three are often attributed to other mathematicians. These are

Euler's 1737 (known to Machin 1706):

Hermann's 1706 (known to Machin 1706):

Hutton's or Vega's (known to Machin 1706):

and Machin's 1706:

 .

In the general case, where the value of a numerator  is not restricted, there are infinitely many other solutions.  For example:

or

Example

The adjacent diagram demonstrates the relationship between the arctangents and their areas. From the diagram, we have the following:

a relation which can also be found by means ofthe following calculation within the complex numbers

More terms
The calculation was performed on a 64-node Hitachi supercomputer with 1 terabyte of main memory, performing 2 trillion operations per second. The following two equations were both used:

 Kikuo Takano (1982).

 
F. C. M. Störmer (1896).

Two equations are used so that one can check they both give the same result; it is helpful if the equations reuse some but not all of the arctangents because those need only be computed once - note the reuse of 57 and 239 above.

Machin-like formulas for  can be constructed by finding a set of numbers where the prime factorisations of  together use no more distinct primes than the number of elements in the set, and then using either linear algebra or the LLL basis-reduction algorithm to construct linear combinations of arctangents  of reciprocals of integer denominators .  For example, for the Størmer formula above, we have

so four terms using between them only the primes 2, 5, 13 and 61.

In 1993 Jörg Uwe Arndt found the 11-term formula:
 
using the set of 11 primes 

Another formula where 10 of the -arguments are the same as above has been discovered by Hwang Chien-Lih (黃見利) (2004), so it is easier to check they both give the same result:
 

You will note that these formulas reuse all the same arctangents after the first one.  They are constructed by looking for numbers where  is divisible only by primes less than 102.

The most efficient currently known Machin-like formula for computing  is:

 
(Hwang Chien-Lih, 1997)

where the set of primes is 

A further refinement is to use "Todd's Process", as described in; this leads to results such as

 
(Hwang Chien-Lih, 2003)
M. Wetherfield found 2004

More methods
One is given by the following formula:

where

and recursively

and

and recursively

This is verified by the following MuPAD code:
z:=(10+I)^8*(84-I)*(21342-I)*(991268848-I)*(193018008592515208050-I)\
  *(197967899896401851763240424238758988350338-I)\
  *(117573868168175352930277752844194126767991915008537018836932014293678271636885792397-I):
Re(z)-Im(z)
0
meaning

Efficiency

It is not the goal of this section to estimate the actual run time of any given algorithm.  Instead, the intention is merely to devise a relative metric by which two algorithms can be compared against each other.

Let  be the number of terms in the Taylor series (see equation ).

Let  be the amount of time spent on each digit (for each term in the Taylor series).

The Taylor series will converge when:

Thus:

For the first term in the Taylor series, all  digits must be processed.  In the last term of the Taylor series, however, there's only one digit remaining to be processed.  In all of the intervening terms, the number of digits to be processed can be approximated by linear interpolation.  Thus the total is given by:

The run time is given by:

Combining equations, the run time is given by:

Where  is a constant that combines all of the other constants.  Since this is a relative metric, the value of  can be ignored.

The total time, across all the terms of equation , is given by:

 cannot be modelled accurately without detailed knowledge of the specific software.  Regardless, we present one possible model.

The software spends most of its time evaluating the Taylor series from equation .  The primary loop can be summarized in the following pseudo code:

In this particular model, it is assumed that each of these steps takes approximately the same amount of time.  Depending on the software used, this may be a very good approximation or it may be a poor one.

The unit of time is defined such that one step of the pseudo code corresponds to one unit.  To execute the loop, in its entirety, requires four units of time.   is defined to be four.

Note, however, that if  is equal to one, then step one can be skipped.  The loop only takes three units of time.   is defined to be three.

As an example, consider the equation:

The following table shows the estimated time for each of the terms:

The total time is 0.75467 + 0.54780 + 0.60274 = 1.9052

Compare this with equation .  The following table shows the estimated time for each of the terms:

The total time is 1.1191 + 0.8672 = 1.9863

The conclusion, based on this particular model, is that equation  is slightly faster than equation , regardless of the fact that equation  has more terms. This result is typical of the general trend. In order to achieve a high ratio, it is necessary to add additional terms. Often, there is a net savings in time.

References

External links
 
 The constant π
 Machin's Merit at MathPages

Pi algorithms